Dambel (Nones: Dambel) is a comune (municipality) in Trentino in the northern Italian region Trentino-Alto Adige/Südtirol, located about  north of the city of Trento.

It is on the provincial highway between Sanzeno to the south and Sarnonico to the north. The town's name derives from the Latin word ambulum because it was at an historical crossroads on the commercial road between Lombardy and Germany, which crossed through Dambel and over the Novella River at the Pozzena bridge. Today the economy of Dambel is concentrated on the production of apples.

Geography

Dambel borders the following municipalities: Brez, Sarnonico, Cloz, Romallo, Romeno and Sanzeno.

Demographic evolution

References

External links
 Homepage of the city

Cities and towns in Trentino-Alto Adige/Südtirol